The following are the national records in athletics in the Seychelles maintained by the Seychelles Athletics Federation (SAF).

Outdoor

Key to tables:

h = hand timing

A = affected by altitude

Men

Women

Indoor

Men

Women

Notes

References
General
Seychellois Records 31 December 2019 updated
World Athletics Statistic Handbook 2022: National Outdoor Records
World Athletics Statistic Handbook 2022: National Indoor Records
Specific

External links
SAF official web site

Seychelles
Records
Athletics